Emmanuel Charles McCarthy (born October 9, 1940) is an American priest of the Melkite Catholic Church, as well as a peace activist and author.

He has been a Catholic priest since August 9, 1981, when he was ordained in Damascus, Syria. He received his Bachelor of Arts Degree with majors in philosophy and English from the University of Notre Dame in 1962. He received Masters Degrees in English and in Theology from the same university. He earned his Doctorate in Jurisprudence from Boston College Law School in 1967 and was soon after admitted to the Massachusetts Bar for the practice of law.

The cure of his daughter, Teresia Benedicta, was the official miracle for the canonization of Edith Stein.

Career 
Emmanuel Charles McCarthy taught at the University of Notre Dame where he founded and was the original Director of The Program for the Study and Practice of Nonviolent Conflict Resolution. He was also co-founder of Pax Christi USA, along with Dorothy Day, Gordon Zahn, Eileen Egan, Bishop Carroll Dozier, Bishop Thomas Gumbleton and others . For twenty-five years he served as Spiritual Director and/or Rector of St. Gregory the Theologian Byzantine-Melkite Catholic Seminary. In 1981, he co-founded The Center on Conscience and War in Cambridge MA with John Leary and Gordon Zahn. For twenty-five years he served as Spiritual Director and/or Rector of St. Gregory the Theologian Byzantine-Melkite Catholic Seminary. For over fifty years he has directed retreats and spoken at conferences throughout the world on the issue of the relationship of faith and violence and the Nonviolent Jesus of the Gospels and His Way of Nonviolent Love of friends and enemies.

In 1983 he began The Annual Forty Day Fast for the Truth of Gospel Nonviolence, July 1 to August 9, whose purpose is to pray to the Father in the name of Jesus to bestow on the Churches of Christianity whatever extraordinary graces are needed so that they, individually and collectively, begin to teach and live in relation to the phenomena of violence and enmity what Jesus taught and lived in relation to violence and enmity. This yearly time of prayer and fasting has continued uninterrupted to this very year with people from across the planet having participated in it over the decades.

In 1990 he initiated the Annual July 16 Twenty-Four Hours Day of Prayer for Forgiveness and Protection with Our Lady of Mount Carmel at Trinity Site in the New Mexico desert. July 16 is the feast day of Our Lady of Mt. Carmel, as well as, the day in 1945 when the first atomic bomb was detonated at Trinity Site. This yearly time of prayer also has continued uninterrupted to this very year.

He was the keynote speaker at the Lorraine Motel in Memphis, Tennessee—the place of Martin Luther King, Jr.’s murder—for the 25th anniversary memorial of the assassination of Dr. King there on April 4, 1993. He was nominated for the Nobel Peace Prize for his life’s work of endeavoring to bring the Nonviolent God to the Christian Churches through the Nonviolent Word of God Incarnate, the Nonviolent Jesus, and through the Churches to bring the Nonviolent God of love as revealed by Jesus to all humanity.

He is a member of Delta, Epsilon Sigma, the National Catholic Honor Society, and is the author of several books, including The Nonviolent Eucharist, All Things Flee Thee For Thou Fleest Me: A Cry to the Churches and their Leaders to Return to the Nonviolent Jesus and His Nonviolent Way, Christian Just War Theory: The Logic of Deceit, August 9, and The Stations of the Cross of Nonviolent Love. He has written innumerable popular articles and theological essays on the subject of violence, religion and the Nonviolent Love of friends and enemies that the Jesus of the Gospels teaches by His words and by His deeds.

His CD/DVD series, Behold The Lamb, is almost universally considered to be the most spiritually profound presentation on the matter of the Nonviolent Jesus of the Gospels and His Way of Nonviolent Love of friends and enemies available in those formats.  As Fr. George Zabelka, who was the Catholic Chaplain to the Hiroshima-Nagasaki Atomic Bomb Crews, said, “Fr. McCarthy’s retreat was the turning point in my conversion to Christian Nonviolence.” Bishop Lowell O. Erdahl of the Lutheran Saint Paul Area Synod in Minnesota wrote, “Of those who have challenged military service from a Christian perspective, the most emphatic to my knowledge are Leo Tolstoy and Father Emmanuel Charles McCarthy.”

Reception 
Mairead Corrigan Maguire, Nobel Peace Prize Laureate from Northern Ireland expressed her view of his teaching of Gospel Nonviolence this way, “Fr. McCarthy’s retreat is a remarkable contribution to furthering the understanding of Christian Nonviolence—so urgent a need for Christians today. Clergy and laity owe it to themselves, to the Church, to the world and to God to take time to prayerfully ponder what is said here."In the New York Catholic Worker of October-November 1983, the long-time friend and confidant of Dorothy Day, Deane Mower, wrote: "I was amazed at the closeness of Fr. McCarthy’s concept of nonviolence to that of Dorothy Day. The reason is obvious. Both are scriptural in origin; both base their concepts on Christ Himself. Fr. McCarthy speaks with a kind of eloquent clarity, with more than a touch of prophetic insight. Those who truly desire peace should listen to him."Fr John Dear, probably the most well-known peace activist in the U.S. in the first quarter of the twenty-first century said, “Fr. McCarthy is the best teacher on Christian nonviolence in the United States.” Walter Wink, author of the seminal work, Jesus and Nonviolence: A Third Way, and of The Power Trilogy: naming the powers, unmasking the powers and engaging the powers, and who was Professor of Biblical Interpretation at Auburn University, declared: “Fr. McCarthy is the most powerful voice for nonviolence in the world today.”

See also
Edith Stein

References

External links links
 Official website

Year of birth missing (living people)
Living people
American Melkite Greek Catholics
Nonviolence advocates
University of Notre Dame faculty
Eastern Catholic priests